The RMIT School of Civil, Environmental and Chemical Engineering was an Australian tertiary education school within the College of Science Engineering and Health of RMIT University.

See also
RMIT University

School of Civil, Chemical and Environmental Engineering, RMIT